Caruso is an unincorporated community in Sherman County, Kansas, United States.

References

Further reading

External links
 Sherman County maps: Current, Historic, KDOT

Unincorporated communities in Sherman County, Kansas
Unincorporated communities in Kansas